Michael Bunn is a tubist and professor of music. Bunn is currently Principal Tubist of the Kennedy Center Opera House Orchestra, Fairfax Symphony Orchestra, and Filene Center Orchestra at Wolf Trap Farm Park.

Teachers

His former teachers include David Bragunier (former Principal Tubist, National Symphony Orchestra), Warren Deck (former Principal Tubist, New York Philharmonic), Paul Kryzwicki (former Principal Tubist, Philadelphia Orchestra), and Arnold Jacobs (former Principal Tubist, Chicago Symphony Orchestra).

Career

Musicianship

Bunn has performed with Baltimore Symphony, Baltimore Opera, Paris Opera, Washington Opera, Orchestre National de France, Bolshoi Opera and Ballet, Kirov Ballet, and the Concertgebouw Orchestra. He has been soloist with the United States Army Band, Fairfax Symphony Orchestra, Baltimore Symphony Orchestra and myriad chamber recital with such artists as flautist Jean-Pierre Rampal. He has toured South Korea, Taiwan, and Japan with the Baltimore Symphony Orchestra.

Institutional musical teaching posts

Bunn has previously served on the faculties of George Mason University, St. Mary's College of Maryland, University of Maryland, Catholic University, George Washington University, and Shenandoah Conservatory. He currently serves on the faculties of Towson University, and Howard University.

External links
 Faculty bios at Shenandoah University
 Faculty bios at Towson University

Living people
Shenandoah University faculty
George Mason University faculty
Howard University faculty
St. Mary's College of Maryland faculty
Towson University faculty
University of Maryland, College Park faculty
George Washington University faculty
American classical tubists
Year of birth missing (living people)
Benjamin T. Rome School of Music, Drama, and Art faculty
21st-century tubists